Dietmar Dath (born 3 April 1970) is a German author, journalist and translator.

Life
Born in Rheinfelden, Dath grew up in Schopfheim, Germany, and finished high school in Freiburg. After civilian service he studied German studies and physics in Freiburg. He lives in Freiburg, Frankfurt and Leipzig.

Since 1990 he has published articles and short stories in German and international newspapers and magazines on sociological, philosophical and cultural topics. Besides his real name, he has been known to use pseudonyms such as "David Dalek", "Dagmar Dath" or "Dieter Draht". In his early career he translated works by Joe Lansdale, Kodwo Eshun and Buddy Giovinazzo into German. Dath was chief editor of the magazine Spex from 1998 to 2000. From 2001 to 2007 he was an editor for the Arts section at the Frankfurter Allgemeine Zeitung. Apart from writing novels and book-length essays, since 2009 he has worked on several projects with musicians such as Kammerflimmer Kollektief, Mouse on Mars and Jens Friebe. After a professional break during which he wrote novels, two plays and some poetry, in September 2011 he returned as a full-time Arts section editor and film critic to the Frankfurter Allgemeine Zeitung.

Literary works
Dath's first books were published in the mid-nineties by various small publishers such as Verbrecher Verlag, SuKuLTuR, Edition Phantasia and later Hablizel. In 2003 Dath published Höhenrausch at the Eichborn-Verlag (now at Rowohlt) and since 2005 he has been with the Suhrkamp Verlag. In 2008 his science fiction novel Abschaffung der Arten (translated by Samuel P. Willcocks into English as Abolition of the Species) was shortlisted for the German Book Prize. Furthermore, the novel was awarded 2009 the Kurd Laßwitz Award. In 2013 he received the Kurd Laßwitz Award a second time for his novel Pulsarnacht. Translations of Dietmar Dath's works (mainly novels) have appeared in Russian, Greek, Korean, Polish, and English. 
In his novels, which are mostly in the vein of fantastic literature – horror, sf and fantasy – Dath often works with autobiographical topics. A lot of them feature people who live in small towns such as the one he came from, many characters also work in the media or other sectors of the culture industry. Dath's works deal with aesthetics as well as social, political, sexual, biological and gender issues in often science-fictional ways. Among his influences are writers as diverse as Harlan Ellison, Joanna Russ, Nicola Griffith, Carol Emshwiller, Theodore Sturgeon, Irmtraud Morgner and Peter Hacks. His book Niegeschichte reflects on nearly 1000 pages about the genre of science fiction as a machine of art that can also change thinking, it was published in 2019 by Matthes & Seitz Berlin.

Political stance
Dath is a Marxist. In the film documentary by Alexander Kluge about Karl Marx's Capital Dath is featured as an expert. In January 2009 he discussed the future of a Marxist outlook on society with Philipp Oehmke in Der Spiegel – and answered to the question whether he is in favor of abolishing capitalism entirely with "Yes, absolutely," and said of his preferred replacement system "Marx calls this socialism".

Dath promotes a system of democratic production, maintaining division of labour, on the highest attainable technological level. He updates Lenin, Marx and others which also enters into his literary oeuvre – Für immer in Honig (Forever in honey), for example, refers explicitly to Lenin's "What is to be done". His most recent political essay is "Maschinenwinter" (machine winter), many explicit references to political matters can be found in the semibiographical interview conducted in 2011 by Martin Hatzius and published in book form as Alles fragen, nichts fürchten (ask all, fear nothing).

Work

Books, novels, stories
 Cordula killt Dich! oder Wir sind doch nicht Nemesis von jedem Pfeifenheini. Roman der Auferstehung. Berlin: Verbrecher Verlag 1995
 Die Ehre des Rudels. Horrornovelle. Berlin: Maas Verlag 1996
 Charonia Tritonis. Ein Konzert, Dumme bitte wegbleiben. Erzählung. Berlin: SuKuLTuR Verlag 1997 (= „Schöner Lesen“ Nr. 3)
 Der Minkowski-BaumfroschFortsetzungs. Novel in 12 Kapiteln. Berlin: De-Bug 2000.
 Skye Boat Song. Novel. Berlin: Verbrecher Verlag 2000
 Am blinden Ufer. Eine Geschichte vom Strand und aus den Schnitten. Novel. Berlin: Verbrecher Verlag 2000
 Phonon oder Staat ohne Namen. Novel. Berlin: Edition Pfadintegral im Verbrecher Verlag 2001. Neuauflage: 2004
 Schwester Mitternacht. Novel (mit Barbara Kirchner). Berlin: Verbrecher Verlag 2002
 Ein Preis. Halbvergessene Geschichte aus der Wahrheit. Berlin: SuKuLTuR Verlag 2003 (= „Schöner Lesen“ Nr. 18)
 Für immer in Honig. Novel. Berlin: Implex Verlag 2005. Neuauflage: Berlin: Verbrecher Verlag 2008
 Dirac. Novel. Frankfurt/Main: Suhrkamp Verlag 2006
 Waffenwetter. Novel. Frankfurt/Main: Suhrkamp Verlag 2007
 Das versteckte Sternbild. Novel (als David Dalek). Berlin: Shayol Verlag 2007
 Die Abschaffung der Arten. Novel. Frankfurt/Main: Suhrkamp Verlag 2008. Published in an English translation by Samuel P. Willcocks as The abolition of species, London: Seagull Books, 2013  
 Sie schläft. FilmNovel Edition Phantasia: Bellheim 2009
 Sämmtliche Gedichte. Novel. Frankfurt/Main: Suhrkamp Verlag 2009
 Deutschland macht dicht. Novel. Berlin: Suhrkamp Verlag: 2010 
 Eisenmäuse. Ein verschlüsselter Sittenspiegel. Lohmar: Hablizel 2010
 Kleine Polizei im Schnee. Stories. Verbrecher Verlag: Berlin 2012
 Pulsarnacht. Novel. Heyne: München 2012
 Feldeváye: Roman der letzten Künste. Novel. Suhrkamp Verlag: Berlin 2014
 Venus siegt. Novel. Hablizel Verlag: Lohmar 2015 
 Deutsche Demokratische Rechnung.Eine Liebeserzählung. Novel. Eulenspiegel Verlag: Berlin 2015
 Leider bin ich tot. Novel. Suhrkamp Verlag: Berlin 2016, .
 Der Schnitt durch die Sonne. Novel. S. Fischer Verlag, Frankfurt am Main 2017, .
 Du bist mir gleich. Novel. Golden Press, Bremen 2019, .
 Neptunation. Novel. Fischer Tor, Frankfurt 2019, .

Plays

 Waffenwetter. UA 17. April 2009, Nationaltheater Mannheim
 Die Abschaffung der Arten. UA 8. November 2009, Deutsches Theater Berlin
 Maschinenwinter. UA 2009, Centraltheater Leipzig Regie: Martin Laberenz
 Annika. Spiel für fünf Menschen, UA Februar 2011, Schauspiel Frankfurt, Frankfurter Positionen 2011
 Sie schläft. UA 12. März 2011, Zimmertheater Tübingen
 Regina Oder Die Eichhörnchenküsse, UA 22. September 2011, Nationaltheater Mannheim
 Farbenblinde Arbeit, UA 17. Dezember 2014, Nationaltheater Mannheim
 Ein Volksfeind, Bearbeitung nach Henrik Ibsen UA 10. September 2015, Schauspielhaus Zürich
 Die nötige Folter, UA 2019, Staatstheater Augsburg
 Frankenstein, UA 10. Januar 2019, Schauspielhaus Zürich

Essays, non-fiction and others

 Schöner rechnen. Die Zukunft der Computer. Berlin: Berliner Taschenbuch Verlag 2002
 Höhenrausch. Die Mathematik des XX. Jahrhunderts in zwanzig Gehirnen. Frankfurt/Main: Eichborn Verlag (Die andere Bibliothek) 2003
 Sie ist wach. Über ein Mädchen das hilft, schützt und rettet. Berlin: Implex Verlag 2003 (Über die Fernsehserie Buffy – Im Bann der Dämonen)
 Die salzweißen Augen. Vierzehn Briefe über Drastik und Deutlichkeit. Frankfurt/Main: Suhrkamp Verlag 2005
 Heute keine Konferenz. Texte für die Zeitung. Frankfurt/Main: Suhrkamp Verlag 2007 (edition suhrkamp)
 The Shramps. Mit Daniela Burger. Berlin: Implex Verlag / Verbrecher Verlag 2007
 Maschinenwinter. Wissen, Technik, Sozialismus. Eine Streitschrift. Frankfurt/Main: Suhrkamp Verlag 2008 (edition unsold)
 Rosa Luxemburg, Suhrkamp Verlag, Frankfurt am Main 2010 
 Alles fragen, nichts fürchten. Mit Martin Hatzius. Berlin: Das neue Berlin 2011.
 Mädchenschönschriftaufgabe. Aus der Reihe: Documenta 13: 100 Notizen – 100 Gedanken Nr. 036. Ostfildern: Hatje Cantz Verlag 2011.
 Lost. Diaphanes, Zürich 2012, .
 mit Heike Aumüller: Verbotene Verbesserungen. Starfruit Publ., Nürnberg 2012, .
 Lichtmächte. Diaphanes, Zürich 2013, .
 Klassenkampf im Dunkeln: Zehn zeitgemäße sozialistische Übungen. Konkret Texte 65. Konkret Verlag KVV, Hamburg 2014, .
 Superhelden. Reclam, Leipzig 2016, .
 Karl Marx. Reclam, Leipzig 2018, .
 Das Menschen Mögliche. Zur Aktualität von Günther Anders. Wien 2018, .
 Niegeschichte. Science Fiction als Kunst- und Denkmaschine. Berlin 2019, .
 Hegel. 100 Seiten. Reclam, Leipzig 2020, .
 Stehsatz: Eine Schreiblehre.  Wallstein, Göttingen 2020, .

Poetry

 Gott ruft zurück. Gedichte. Leipzig: Connewitzer Verlagsbuchhandlung 2011

Audio

 Im erwachten Garten. With Kammerflimmer Kollektief. Staubgold 2009
 Die Abschaffung der Arten. With Mouse On Mars. Intermedium 2011
 Die Abschaffung der Arten. Shortcut. Short Version (101'12) of the Eleven-hour-long Adaptation for Radio. With Katja Bürkle (Späth), Anna Schudt (Alexandra), Paul Herwig (Feuer), Katharina Marie Schubert (Padma), Wiebke Puls, Sylvester Groth, Rainer Bock, Brigitte Hobmeier (Philomena), Julia Jentsch, Tobias Lelle, Oliver Nägele, Felix Klare, Wolfgang Pregler, Nina Kunzendorf, Tabea Bettin, Karin Anselm, Stephan Bissmeier, Michael Tregor, Steven Scharf, Philipp Moog, Mogens von Gadow, Aglaia Szyszkowitz, Hildegard Schmahl, Stefan Hunstein, Oliver Mallison, Saskia Mallison, Julia Loibl. Komposition: Mouse On Mars. Director: Ulrich Lampen. BR Hörspiel und Medienkunst 2011/2012.
 Ovale Fenster. Radio Drama by Dietmar Dath, Thomas Weber und Volker Zander. Kammerflimmer Kollektief. SWR ars acustica 2012.
 Larissa oder Sprich diesen Tod nicht aus. Radio Drama by Dietmar Dath & Thomas Weber. Director: Iris Drögekamp. Composition: Kammerflimmer Kollektief. SWR ars acustica 2013.
 Antilopenverlobung. By Dietmar Dath und Mareike Maage. With Cathlen Gawlich, Eva Verena Müller, Marc Hosemann, Andreas Grothgar, Frank Genser, Edda Fischer, Sigrid Burkholder, Jörg Hartmann and Stephanie Eidt. Director: Leonhard Koppelmann. BR Hörspiel und Medienkunst 2013.  Podcast/Download via BR Hörspiel Pool.
 Silber gegen Ende. with The Schwarzenbach. Radio Drama by Heike Aumüller, Dietmar Dath, Johannes Frisch und Thomas Weber. SRF 2014.
 Largoschmerzen. Ein sozialmedizinisches Desaster. Radio Drama with Mmt Bettina Lieder, Matthias Haase, Johanna Gastdorf, Mark Oliver Bögel, Sebastian Graf. Director: Leonhard Koppelmann. BR-Hörspiel und Medienkunst 2014.  Podcast/Download via BR Hörspiel Pool.
 2015: Mit Thomas Gebel: Deutsches Demokratisches Rechnen (Die Geschichte einer abgebrochenen Computerrevolution) – Director: Martin Heindel (Feature – RBB)
 Die Magnetin. Musikbild einer gefährlichen Liebe. Radio Drama by Dietmar Dath. Director: Iris Drögekamp & Thomas Weber. SWR 2015.
 Nie mehr warten. Ein Sprech-, Sing- und Musikdrama. Zur Russischen Revolution 1917. Radio Drama by Dietmar Dath. Director: Iris Drögekamp & Thomas Weber. SWR 2017.
 Maryam. Kein Nachruf für Euch. Radio Drama by Dietmar Dath. Composition and Songs: Sophia Kennedy. Director: Henri Hüster. BR/NDR 2019. Podcast/Download via NDR.

Translations

 Kodwo Eshun: Heller als die Sonne: Abenteuer in der Sonic Fiction. Id-Verlag 1999
 Joe R. Lansdale: Drive-In. Maas Verlag 1997
 Buddy Giovinazzo: Cracktown. Maas Verlag 1995
 Paul Di Filippo: Mund voll Zungen. Suhrkamp Verlag 2010

Other publications

 Liz Disch und der Hermit King. Mit: Ik krijg je nog wel und Adler in Ordnung. Hrsg. Barbara Kirchner, Kevil Library No.2, Graben Verlag 1994
 Contra naturam. In: Johannes Ullmaier (Hrsg.) Schicht! Arbeitsreportagen für die Endzeit, Frankfurt a/M: Suhrkamp, S. 386–411
 Vier Treppen durch Döblin. Essay. In: Neue Rundschau 120/1, S. 23–31. Frankfurt/Main: S. Fischer 2009
 Solus Ipse. Leerer Drache. Beitrag in: Karla Schmidt (Hrsg.): Hinterland. Nittendorf: Wurdack 2010.

References

External links

 

1970 births
Living people
People from Rheinfelden (Baden)
German male journalists
German journalists
German newspaper journalists
21st-century German journalists
German anti-capitalists
German Marxists
German male musicians
German science fiction writers
German technology writers
German translators
Writers from Baden-Württemberg
German male writers
Frankfurter Allgemeine Zeitung people